The Goedemoed shooting was a mass murder that occurred at the prison complex in Goedemoed, a town in Orange Free State, South Africa on August 25, 1992, when police constable L. S. Hasebeng killed eight people and wounded four others, most of them fellow police officers, before committing suicide.

Victims
 Tseliso George, police assistant
 Constable S. Gabriel Lekhula
 Cynthia Lekhula, wife of Gabriel Lekhula
 Phalisa Lekhula, 4, daughter of Gabriel and Cynthia Lekhula
 Ernestina Mile, 21, daughter of Cynthia Lekhula
 Mavis Mile, 17, daughter of Cynthia Lekhula
 Adjutant officer Chris E. Schutte, commander of Goedemoed police
 Vakele Tyu, police assistant

Those wounded were constable Lucas Musi, police assistant Pakiso Ramarumo, captain Bettie van Wyk, and eight-year-old Thobela Dumayi.

References

External links
Held vertel van berserker se spoor van moord, Die Burger (August 26, 1992)
Vader sterf vlak voor sy seun in koeël--slagting Polisieman laat streep lyke, pleeg selfmoord, Die Burger (August 26, 1992)
Ondersoek kom ná afgryslike moorde, Die Burger (August 26, 1992)
Gewonde maak of sy dood is; ontkom, Die Burger (August 26, 1992)
Berserker SAP-lid mog nie wis van ondersoek, Die Burger (August 27, 1992)
Nuus van verkrag-klag het SAP-lid glo laat skiet, Die Burger (August 27, 1992)
Geweld, Die Burger (August 29, 1992)
Koeël vlieg rakelings verby SAP-lid en slaan in muur vas, Beeld (August 26, 1992)
Koeël skiet gate in sy trui, maar mis kaptein, Beeld (August 26, 1992)
Ek kon voel hoe die koeëls in my vasslaan, Beeld (August 26, 1992)

Mass murder in 1992
Mass shootings in South Africa
Deaths by firearm in South Africa
Murder–suicides in Africa
Orange Free State
August 1992 events in Africa
1992 murders in South Africa
1992 mass shootings in Africa
1990s massacres in South Africa